Duck Sauce is an electronic music superduo, formed in 2009 in New York City. The duo consists of American DJ Armand van Helden and Canadian DJ A-Trak. They are best known for their 2010 single "Barbra Streisand".

The duo released a Mixtape named "Duck Tape" in October 2013, and their album "Quack" in April 2014. Awards the duo has won are the Best Underground Dance Track in 2011 and 2012, and Best Dance Video - International in 2011.

History

Duck Sauce's first tracks are "aNYway" and "You're Nasty". The track "aNYway" capitalizes "NY" to signify the duo's New York origins. The song was originally called "A New York Way" but was later shortened. The song samples "I Can Do It" by Final Edition. Duck Sauce's debut EP Greatest Hits was released on July 15, 2010.

In the summer of 2010, Duck Sauce released a track, "Barbra Streisand", named after the singer of the same name. The track heavily samples the 1979 song "Gotta Go Home" by Boney M., which itself is based upon "Hallo Bimmelbahn" by the German band Nighttrain. The famous hookline is written by Heinz Huth. "Barbra Streisand" was first played at Miami Winter Music Conference in 2010 and gained heavy DJ and radio support in the UK, Ireland, Germany, Norway, Austria, Poland, France, Finland, Romania, Australia, New Zealand, South Africa, and Sri Lanka. The song peaked at No. 3 on the UK Singles Chart and reached No. 1 on the Australian ARIA Club Chart as of 12 September 2010. For the Billboard week ending December 18, 2010, the song reached the #1 position on the Dance/Club Play Songs chart. On April 26, 2011, the song was featured in the musical television series Glee'''s 18th episode of their second season. The song was also featured in the Vitamin Water Revive commercial. The "Barbra Streisand" music video reached over 100 million total views.

"Big Bad Wolf" was released by Duck Sauce in 2011 on BBC Radio and samples wolves howling. The music video features genitalia replaced by human heads. A-Trak notes "When Keith came up with this idea of 'crotchfaces,' we just thought it was hilarious."

On June 6, 2013, announced via Facebook, a preview of the song "It's You" was shown, with the full song released on June 25, 2013. "It's You" samples the track of the same name from FirstCom's OneMusic library. The music video features a barber shop transformed into a surreal dance party which comes to life with the beat of the song. The music video earned Duck Sauce a nomination at the 2013 MTV Video Music Awards.

In October of the same year they released "Radio Stereo". The song is a rework of "Radio", a 1982 hit by UK punk act The Members. The original chorus, "We listen to the radio! It's better than the stereo", is looped over a driving, funky bass and playful sampling. Songwriter Nigel Bennett of The Members was quoted saying that he was happy that Duck Sauce discovered his song and loved what they've done with "Radio Stereo".

On October 12, 2013, they appeared on BBC Radio 1's Essential Mix. The first hour of that mix, which contained many unreleased demos, was later released as a mixtape titled Duck Tape. Four of these demos were released in January 2014 on the Duck Droppings EP.

On the Essential Mix broadcast Duck Sauce announced a full album, Quack'', to be released through Fool's Gold Records in early 2014. The album features twelve songs by the duo, including "Barbra Streisand", "aNYway", "It's You", and "Radio Stereo". The album's lead single "NRG" samples Melissa Manchester's 1985 track "Energy" and was named Zane Lowe's "Hottest Record in the World" on April 3, 2014. The album was released on April 14, 2014.

On January 1, 2020, member A-Trak teased a comeback of Duck Sauce on his Twitter account. Later that week, it was revealed that the duo were to perform at Coachella that April. This ended up not taking place due to the cancellation of the event as a result of the COVID-19 pandemic.  They subsequently performed at the 2022 edition of Coachella.

Discography

Albums

Extended plays

Mixtapes

Singles

Music videos

Awards and nominations

International Dance Music Awards

|-
| rowspan="3"|2011
| rowspan="3"|"Barbra Streisand"
| Best Break-Through Artist
| 
|-
| Best Best House/Garage Track
| 
|-
| Best Underground Dance Track
| 
|-
| rowspan="4"|2012
| rowspan="4"|"Big Bad Wolf"
|-
| Best Music Video
| 
|-
| Best Artist - Group
| 
|-
| Best Underground Dance Track
| 
|-
|}

Grammy Awards

|-
|2012
|"Barbra Streisand"
|Best Dance Recording
|
|}

MTV Video Music Awards

|-
|rowspan="2"| 2012
|rowspan="2"| "Big Bad Wolf"
| Best Electronic Dance Music Video
| 
|-
| Best Direction
| 
|-
| 2013
| "It's You"
| Best Visual Effects
|

UK Music Video Awards

|-
| 2011
| "Barbra Streisand"
|  Best Dance Video - International
| 
|-
| rowspan="3" | 2012
| rowspan="3" | "Big Bad Wolf"
| Best Dance Video - International
| 
|-
| Best Art Direction 
| 
|-
| Best VFX
|

References

External links

 

American house music duos
Electronic dance music duos
Musical groups established in 2009
Musical groups from New York City
Male musical duos
Republic Records artists
Because Music artists
Casablanca Records artists
Ultra Records artists
Arista Records artists